Lucas Cândido Silva (born 25 December 1993) is a Brazilian footballer who plays for Al Dhafra. Mainly a defensive midfielder, he can also play as a left-back in either side.

Honours
Atlético Mineiro
Copa Libertadores: 2013
Campeonato Mineiro: 2013, 2015, 2017
Copa do Brasil: 2014

References

External links
Atletico official profile 

1993 births
Living people
Sportspeople from Minas Gerais
Brazilian footballers
Brazilian expatriate footballers
Brazil youth international footballers
Association football midfielders
Clube Atlético Mineiro players
Esporte Clube Vitória players
Associação Atlética Ponte Preta players
Al Dhafra FC players
UAE Pro League players
Campeonato Brasileiro Série A players
Campeonato Brasileiro Série B players
Brazilian expatriate sportspeople in the United Arab Emirates
Expatriate footballers in the United Arab Emirates